Angel City is a play by Sam Shepard. Set in Hollywood, the play concerns an attempted collaboration between Wheeler – a film industry insider – and ambitious newcomer Rabbit.

Production history
Angel City was first produced at the Magic Theatre in San Francisco on July 2, 1976. The cast was as follows:
Lanx – Jack Thiebeau
Wheeler – John Nesci
Miss Scoons – O-Lan Shepard
Rabbit – Ebie Roe Smith
Tympani – James Dean
Sax – Bob Feldman
Directed by Sam Shepard

References

1976 plays
Plays by Sam Shepard
Plays set in Los Angeles
Hollywood, Los Angeles in fiction